Hibiscus Coast A.F.C is an amateur football club based in Stanmore Bay on the Whangaparaoa Peninsula, New Zealand. The club was founded in 1974, and its home ground is located at Stanmore Bay Park, Whangaparaoa.

History 
The club mainly played in the four or third division in the Northern League from 1974 to 2003 when they were promoted to NRFL Division 2. They were then promoted to NRFL Division 1 in 2013 and would stay there until 2019 when they were relegated to Division 2 again.

The clubs best run in the New Zealand Chatham Cup was in 2008 when they made the last sixteen.

References

External links
Official club website
Northern Regional Football League

Association football clubs in Auckland
1974 establishments in New Zealand
Association football clubs established in 1974